The Easter Bunny is Comin' to Town is a 1977 musical Easter television special produced by Rankin/Bass Productions, using their "Animagic" stop motion animation. It reunites the writer Romeo Muller. designer Paul Coker Jr., and narrator Fred Astaire, and stars the voices of Skip Hinnant, Bob McFadden, Meg Sargent, James Spies, and Allen Swift. The special originally premiered on ABC in the United States on April 6, 1977.

The special includes original songs including two sung by Astaire: "The Easter Bunny Is Comin' to Town" and "All You Have to Do is Think 'Can Do'".

Plot
S.D. Kluger returns as a train engineer, but still a mailman to answer questions about the Easter Bunny in the children's letters.

The story begins in the small town of Kidville, run by all orphaned children (including S.D. Kluger when he was a child) and located on the other side of Big Rock Mountain. The children enjoy the simple life, despite being bothered by Gadzooks the Bear who hates everything to do with the holidays, including birthdays.

One Easter morning, they find an orphaned baby rabbit, raise him as their own, and name him Sunny when they notice how much he likes the warm sun. Sunny, now one year old, makes plans with the children to sell what they make in exchange for what they need, including their eggs, with help from three chickens called the Hendrew Sisters.

Sunny sets off to deliver his eggs. Along the way, he meets an eccentric and yet friendly hobo named Hallelujah Jones, who suggests to him that he could sell his eggs in a town that's just called Town. However, upon climbing Big Rock Mountain, Sunny runs into Gadzooks who steals his eggs. After escaping, Sunny makes it to Town which is a dreary, dismal place. There, nobody laughs, everyone dresses in dark clothing, and if any children are born, the whole family has to move away, and beans are eaten for every meal by order of the ruthless Dowager Duchess Lily Longtooth who wants her seven-year-old nephew King Bruce the Frail to follow in her footsteps. Bruce complains about always having to eat beans and wanting to be a normal child instead of being a king, despite his aunt's objections.

Saddened by this, Sunny heads back to Kidville and explains the problem. Hallelujah and the children dip the eggs in various bowls of paint as a way of tricking Gadzooks. He lies to the bear, saying he is on his way to sell colored stones as paperweights. Gadzooks, befuddled by Sunny's lie, lets him go, demanding he bring him eggs.

Sunny makes it into Town again, passing out his eggs to all the townspeople, including King Bruce who crowns him the Easter Bunny, Royal Knight of the Rainbow Eggs. He and Sunny initiate a traditional ritual of eating the eggs. However, Lily, disappointed in her nephew, chases Sunny out, outlaws eggs, and sends him to bed without supper. After Bruce tells Sunny-(who apologizes for getting Bruce punished about the eggs) that he knew his supper would be more beans, Sunny promises to bring him very special beans next Easter.

The following year, Sunny, Hallelujah, and Herbert the Baker make the first Easter jelly beans. However, upon their way to Town to deliver them, Gadzooks, still angered by Sunny's lie and thinking his eggs are colored stones again, flings them far, far away. All hope seems lost until all the other children hunt the eggs up in bushes and trees and Sunny decides that he'll always hide them.

Next Easter, Sunny sets out, only to get caught by Gadzooks who chases him to Kidville, where everybody has all pitched in to make him a brand-new Easter outfit made by the Kidville tailors. Touched by their gesture of kindness, Gadzooks becomes their friend. Meanwhile back in Town, the townspeople become interested in the Easter eggs Sunny hides, King Bruce and his servants enjoy eating the jelly beans and the children are loved by all the townspeople. But Lily, outraged, sends her guards out to arrest them. Sunny and the children leave just in time, and promise to return next year.

Next Easter, Sunny has the candy maker come up with a secret weapon of his own for their next visit. Hallelujah suggests Sunny should do something for Bruce so he can stand up to Lily, which Sunny agrees to and goes to the Kidville seamstress and pillow makers for this idea. On their next visit to Town, after causing the guards to trip on the rolling Easter eggs, Sunny hops into a paper bag, where the guards discover that they captured a chocolate bunny, thus being let into Town where Sunny brings Bruce stuffed animals to give him courage every night when he is lonely. Just as Bruce is about to give Sunny permission to come to Town whenever he wants, Lily arrives to stop him. Bruce tells her that he outranks her, but finds it difficult. Afterwards, Lily tells her guards to do anything they can to stop Sunny from coming to Town.

The following year, Sunny and friends plan to have Gadzooks help them bring all the Easter treats to Town. However, Lily's guards cause the bear to trip and break his big toe. Everyone is saddened that Gadzooks can't help, but Hallelujah suggests that they build a railroad over Big Rock Mountain from Kidville to Town. After the railroad is built, Sunny and his friends go to the trainyard to hire a train to carry all the goods. However, since the big engines in the roundhouse are too important to help, they find a small switch engine named Chugs (who would become the famous Little Engine Who Could and is helping S.D. Kluger deliver mail) all rusty after being put down for years. They hire him and paint him yellow.

Meanwhile, Lily orders her guards to do anything they can to stop the train from getting to Town. They spread melted butter on the rails, causing Chugs to slip, but Hallelujah pours jelly beans on the butter, providing extra traction and allowing them to climb the hill, thus foiling Lily's plan.

Soon after, they all make it to Town where everyone is happily celebrating. But Lily is upset, thinking Bruce will banish her forever. However, he and Sunny give her an Easter flower named after her called a lily. Afterwards, everyone celebrates with a train ride on Chugs. Even S.D. Kluger gets in on all the fun.

Cast
 Fred Astaire – S.D. Kluger
 Skip Hinnant – Sunny
 Gia Anderson – Child
 George Brennan – Child
 Stacy Carey – Child
 Laura Dean – Child
 Jill Choder – Chicken #1, Chicken #2
 Karen Dahle – Linda the Schoolteacher, Chicken #3
 Ron Marshall – Hallelujah Jones, green engine, brown engine, Town guard
 Bob McFadden – Chugs, Old Man
 Michael McGovern – Herbert the Baker
 Meg Sargent – Dowager Duchess Lily Longtooth
 James Spies – King Bruce the Frail
 Allen Swift – Gadzooks, Newsreel announcer, blue engine, red engine, Town guard

Crew
 Producers/Directors – Arthur Rankin Jr., Jules Bass
 Associate Producer – Masaki Iizuka
 Writer – Romeo Muller
 Music/Lyrics – Maury Laws, Jules Bass
 Design – Paul Coker Jr.
 Animagic Supervisor – Akikazu Kono
 Sound Recorders – John Curcio, Dave Iveland
 Sound Effects – Tom Clark
 Music Arranger/Conductor – Bernard Hoffer

Songs
 The Easter Bunny is Comin' to Town - Fred Astaire
 Which Came First, the Chicken or the Egg? - The Hendrews Sisters
 Someone's Gotta Be First - Skip Hinnant
 You Think Nobody Loves You, But They Do - Ron Marshall and the Hendrews Sisters
 The Big Rock Candy Mountain - Ron Marshall
 Train-Yard Blues - Bob McFadden and the Hendrews Sisters
 All You Have to Do is Think "Can Do" - Fred Astaire and the Cast

Notes
 The Easter Bunny is Comin' to Town was the last Rankin/Bass television special for Fred Astaire, who also played narrator S.D. Kluger in the previous holiday special, Santa Claus is Comin' to Town (1970). It is also a semi-sequel to the earlier special — Santa Claus is only mentioned once in the special and as such, it shares many similarities with the earlier special (Sunny as Kris Kringle, the Kidville kids as the Kringles, King Bruce as Jessica, Hallelujah Jones as Topper, Gadzooks as the Winter Warlock, and Lily Longtooth as Burgermeister Meisterburger). This Easter TV special was also Astaire's second time starring in a production about the holiday, following the 1948 MGM musical Easter Parade.
 This was the third and final Rankin/Bass special about Easter. The first two were Here Comes Peter Cottontail (1971), narrated by Danny Kaye, and The First Easter Rabbit (1976), narrated by Burl Ives.
 Warner Home Video released The Easter Bunny is Comin' to Town on VHS in 1993 and 2000 (as part of Warner's Century 2000 promotion), and on DVD in 2006 and 2008 (in a Deluxe Edition). The 2008 Deluxe Edition DVD release included two bonus features: "The Easter Bunny is Comin’ to Town: The Magic of Stop Motion." and three family-friendly selections consisting of "Breakfast of Magicians", "Floating Through Daydream Garden", and "The Easter Express".

See also
 The First Easter Rabbit
 Here Comes Peter Cottontail
 Santa Claus Is Comin' to Town

References

External links
 
 AllMovie
 Promo

1977 television specials
1970s American television specials
1977 animated films
1977 films
1977 in American television
American Broadcasting Company television specials
1970s animated television specials
1970s American animated films
Rankin/Bass Productions television specials
Stop-motion animated television shows
Films scored by Maury Laws
Television shows directed by Jules Bass
Television shows directed by Arthur Rankin Jr.
Easter television specials
Television shows written by Romeo Muller
Animated films about trains
Musical television specials
Easter Bunny in television